Volgar Sports Palace is an indoor sporting arena located in Tolyatti, Russia.  The capacity of the arena is 2,900.  It was the home arena of the HC Lada Togliatti ice hockey until being replaced by Lada Arena.  Two other examples of this rare Soviet Modernism design style is the Hala Olivia in Gdansk Poland, and the Vilnius Palace of Concerts and Sports in Vilnius, Lithuania.

References

Indoor ice hockey venues in Russia
Indoor arenas in Russia
Sport in Tolyatti
HC Lada Togliatti
Buildings and structures in Samara Oblast